
This is a list of ancient Egyptian people who have articles on Wikipedia. The list covers key ancient Egyptian individuals from the start of the first dynasty until the end of the ancient Egyptian nation in 343 BC.

Note that the dates given are approximate.  The list that is presented below is based on the conventional chronology of Ancient Egypt, mostly based on the Digital Egypt for Universities database developed by the Petrie Museum of Egyptian Archaeology.

A - 
B - 
C - 
D - 
E - 
F - 
G - 
H - 
I - 
J - 
K - 
L - 
M - 
N - 
O - 
P - 
Q - 
R - 
S - 
T - 
U - 
V - 
W - 
X - 
Y - 
Z

A

B

C

D

E

G

H

I

K

L

M

N

O

P

Q

R

S

T

U

W

Y

Z

See also
Other articles including lists of ancient Egyptians:
 List of pharaohs
 List of children of Ramesses II
 Great Royal Wife (including list of title holders)
 God's Wife of Amun (including list of title holders)
 Ancient Egyptians (TV series)

Notes and references

Egypt
 
Egyptians